Francisco Freire Caldera (1839 – July 30, 1900) was a Chilean lawyer, farmer and politician.

Early life
Francisco was born in Santiago in 1839, the son of Manuela Caldera Mascaiano and Gen. Ramón Freire Serrano, one of the principal leaders of the liberal Pipiolo movement who served as the Chilean head of state on of several occasions before the War of the Confederation.

He studied at the National Institute and the University of Chile before being sworn in as a lawyer on December 22, 1863.

Career
He served as deputy for Illapel from 1882 to 1885, serving on the Qualification Commissions of Powers and Budget. He was a substitute senator for Tarapacá from 1885 to 1891, but was disqualified for having accepted an administrative position.

In 1886, he was appointed Mayor of Santiago, which he resigned in the same year to hold the position of Minister of Foreign Affairs and Colonization from October 30, 1886 to June 28, 1887. From March 11, 1887 to March 26, 1887, he served as Deputy Minister of Justice, Public Instruction and Worship. He also held the position of Mayor of Valparaíso.

In 1898 he occupied the Intendancy of Tarapacá and the following year, again that of Santiago.

Personal life
He married Enriqueta Valdés Solar, with whom he had six children: Elisa, Carolina, Alfonso, Isabel, Julia and María.

Francisco died on July 30, 1900.

Descendants
Through his daughter Carolina Freire Valdés, he was a grandfather of diplomat Carmen Vial Freire Dows.

References

1839 births
1900 deaths
Foreign ministers of Chile
Chilean Ministers of Justice
Members of the Senate of Chile
Members of the Chamber of Deputies of Chile
Liberal Party (Chile, 1849) politicians